Ashok Bhagat, popularly known as Baba ji, is an Indian social worker and the secretary of Vikas Bharti, a non-governmental organization working for the upliftment of rural population of Jharkhand. He was born in the Indian state of Uttar Pradesh, holds a master's degree in Arts and a graduate degree in Law and is a nominated leader of Swachh Bharat Abhiyaan campaign for the state of Jharkhand. The Government of India honoured him in 2015 with the Padma Shri, the fourth highest Indian civilian award for his contributions to the area of social service.

References

External links
 

Recipients of the Padma Shri in social work
Social workers
Living people
People from Azamgarh
Social workers from Uttar Pradesh
Year of birth missing (living people)